Stonem may refer to one of two characters in the British teen drama Skins.

 Tony Stonem
 Effy Stonem